Richard Stephens (died 1599)  of Eastington, Gloucestershire, was an English lawyer. 

He was appointed a justice of the peace in Gloucestershire in 1592 and was a Member of Parliament for the constituency of Newport Iuxta Launceston in 1593.

Notes

References

 

1599 deaths
English MPs 1593
English justices of the peace
16th-century English lawyers
People from Gloucestershire